Solidago macrophylla, the largeleaf goldenrod or large-leaved goldenrod, is North American species of herbaceous perennial plants of the family Asteraceae. It is native to eastern and central Canada (from Ontario to Newfoundland & Labrador) and the north-eastern United States (New York and New England). Some of the populations in Québec and Labrador lie north of the Arctic Circle.

Solidago macrophylla is a perennial herb up to 105 cm (42 inches) tall, with a thick woody rhizome. Leaves can be up to 15 cm (6 inches) long. One plant can produce 110 or more small yellow flower heads, mostly on short side branches.

References

External links

Flore laurentienne, Frère Marie-Victorin (1885-1944), Solidago macrophylla Pursh ― Verge d'or à grandes feuilles. ― (Large-leaved goldenrod). in French with line drawing

Flora of Canada
Plants described in 1813
Flora of the Northeastern United States
macrophylla
Flora without expected TNC conservation status